Jam-i-Jahan-Numa was the first known Urdu-language newspaper. It was established in March 1822 in Kolkatta by Harihar Datta. From its eighth issue, it began to be published in Persian as well, and eventually became an exclusively Persian-language newspaper. It operated until 1845. During its lifetime, the newspaper received support from the British colonial government. Famed poet Ghalib criticized the newspaper in a letter to a friend, accusing it to often be inaccurate and unreliable.

References

Publications established in 1822
Newspapers published in India
Urdu-language newspapers
Persian-language newspapers
Publications disestablished in 1845